An SSH server is a software program which uses the Secure Shell protocol to accept connections from remote computers. SFTP/SCP file transfers and remote terminal connections are popular use cases for an SSH server.

General

Platform

The operating systems or virtual machines the SSH servers are designed to run on without emulation; there are several possibilities:

 No indicates that it does not exist or was never released.
 Partial indicates that while it works, the server lacks important functionality compared to versions for other OSs but may still be under development.
 Beta indicates that while a version is fully functional and has been released, it is still in development (e.g. for stability).
 Yes indicates that it has been officially released in a fully functional, stable version.
 Dropped indicates that while the server works, new versions are no longer being released for the indicated OS; the number in parentheses is the last known stable version which was officially released for that OS.
 Included indicates that the server comes pre-packaged with or has been integrated into the operating system.

The list is not exhaustive, but rather reflects the most common platforms today.

Features

See also
 List of SFTP server software
 Comparison of SSH clients

References

Cryptographic software
Internet Protocol based network software
SSH servers
Secure Shell